Sventevith (Storming Near the Baltic) is the debut studio album by Polish extreme metal band Behemoth. It was released in April 1995 by Pagan Records. It has since been re-released through numerous other labels.

The album inside cover artwork shows The Temple of Swarog by Stanisław Jakubowski.

Track listing 

Note: The 2021 reissue has only the first nine songs on CD 1.

Personnel

Release history

References 

Behemoth (band) albums
1995 debut albums
Albums produced by Adam Darski
Pagan Records albums